Glunze is a short river of Brandenburg, Germany. It discharges into the Todnitzsee, which is connected to the Dahme, near Bestensee.

See also
List of rivers of Brandenburg

Rivers of Brandenburg
Rivers of Germany